Israel Beckner Laing (September 27, 1857 – October 29, 1926) was an American politician in the state of Washington. He served in the Washington House of Representatives from 1895 to 1897.

References

Members of the Washington House of Representatives
1857 births
1926 deaths
Washington (state) Populists
People from Front Royal, Virginia